Madhuri Mehta (born 1 November 1991) is an Indian cricketer. She made her Women's One Day International and Women's Twenty20 International against West Indies women's cricket team in 2012. She was the first cricketer from Odisha to play for the women's national team.

References

External links
 

1991 births
Living people
People from Balangir
Cricketers from Odisha
Sportswomen from Odisha
Odisha women cricketers
Indian women cricketers
India women One Day International cricketers
India women Twenty20 International cricketers